Quadrant may refer to:

Companies
 Quadrant Cycle Company, 1899 manufacturers in Britain of the Quadrant motorcar
 Quadrant (motorcycles), one of the earliest British motorcycle manufacturers, established in Birmingham in 1901
 Quadrant Private Equity, an Australian investment firm 
 Quadrant Records, an independent record label
 Quadrant Televentures Ltd., a subsidiary of Videocon Telecom, India

Geography
 A quadrant or section in a city street nomenclature system, see Address (geography)#Quadrants
 Quadrants of Washington, D.C.

Mathematics
 Quadrant (circle), a circular sector equal to one quarter of a circle, or half a semicircle
 Quadrant (plane geometry), a sector of a two-dimensional Cartesian coordinate system
 Quadrant (solid geometry)

Military
 , a Second World War British/Australian warship
 First Quebec Conference, 1943 (codenamed "QUADRANT")

Science and technology
 Galactic quadrant, one out of four circular sectors in the division of the Milky Way galaxy
 Quadrant (abdomen), a division of the abdominal cavity
 Quadrant (architecture) a curve in a wall or vaulted ceiling of a building
 Quadrant (instrument), an angle or time measuring instrument
 Quadrant (semigraphics), a 2×2 semigraphical pixel array in computing

Places
 Quadrant Bus Station, Swansea Wales
 Quadrant:MK, Network Rail's headquarters campus in Milton Keynes
 Quadrant Park, a nightclub in Liverpool, Merseyside
 Quadrant Shopping Centre, Swansea, Wales
 The Quadrant, a housing estate in Kingston upon Hull, UK

Other
 Quadrant (album), a 1977 album by Joe Pass and Milt Jackson
 Quadrant (college basketball), a performance measure derived from the Rating Percentage Index
 Quadrant (magazine), an Australian literary and cultural journal
 Triumph Quadrant, a four-cylinder motorcycle
 A division of dentition - see Glossary of dentistry